The Jim Gregory Award is awarded annually to the Ontario Hockey League General Manager of the Year. The award is selected by a combination of the league's general managers and a five-member panel of OHL writers, broadcasters and NHL central scouting. The award is named for Jim Gregory, who served as the director of the NHL central scouting service.

Winners
List of winners of the Jim Gregory Award.

See also
 List of Canadian Hockey League awards

References

External links
 Ontario Hockey League

Ontario Hockey League trophies and awards
Awards established in 2020